Andrea Mura (born 13 September 1964) is an Italian sailor and former politician.

Sporting career 

 2010 Route du Rhum
 2014 Route du Rhum
 2018 Route du Rhum

Political career 
Mura was expelled from the Five Star Movement in July 2018 for his abstentionism and he later resigned from Parliament.

See also 

 List of members of the Italian Chamber of Deputies, 2018–2022

References 

Living people
1964 births
Politicians affected by a party expulsion process

Deputies of Legislature XVIII of Italy
Five Star Movement politicians
21st-century Italian politicians
Italian sailors
People from Cagliari